Teiu is a commune in the Grigoriopol sub-district of Transnistria, Moldova. It is composed of two villages, Teiu and Tocmagiu (Токмазея). It is currently under the administration of the breakaway government of the Transnistrian Moldovan Republic.

References

Communes of Transnistria